John Wilton may refer to:

Politicians
John W. Wilton (1879–1942), Canadian soldier and politician
John Wilton (Australian politician) (1925–2002), Member of the Victorian Legislative Assembly for Broadmeadows
Sir John Wilton (diplomat) (1921–2011), UK Ambassador to Kuwait and Saudi Arabia
John Wilton (MP), MP for Hereford

Others
Sir John Wilton (general) (1910–1981), Australian general
John Raymond Wilton (1884–1944), Australian-born mathematician
John Wilton established Wilton's Music Hall in London c.1850

See also
Jack Wilton, main character in The Unfortunate Traveller